Nocturnal Poisoning is the debut album by the American black metal band Xasthur, released in 2002. The CD version of the album is limited to 2,000 copies.

Track listing

External links
Nocturnal Poisoning at Discogs

2002 debut albums
Xasthur albums
Southern Lord Records albums